Christleton High School is a large academy school located in the small village of Christleton on the outskirts of Chester. The Headteacher is Darran Jones. The School offers education from age 11 to 18 and has its own Sixth Form.

Three current sitting Members of Parliament attended the school; Sarah Atherton, Samantha Dixon and Luke Pollard.

History 
Christleton County Secondary Modern School opened in 1958 and became the 17th secondary modern school and 57th completed new school to open in Cheshire.

The Secondary Modern and Secondary Technical School was designed to cater for the needs of pupils in the developing areas of Vicars Cross, Guilden Sutton, Mickle Trafford, Waverton, Barrow and Christleton, but also took in pupils from an area of approximately 75 sq miles.

The first school in Christleton was the John Sellars Charity School, built on land adjacent to the church in 1779, and was primarily for the education of boys. The same charity built a Girls’ and Infants’ School on land opposite the present High School, and this was extended in 1873.

The structure of schools for local children was established but there were also fee paying schools e.g. Christleton Academy for Young Gentlemen, and a Dame School which was adjacent to where the school stands today. This remained the structure until after World War II, when the building of new homes and private estates led to the need for additional schools.

In the late 1950s, Christleton was situated in the administrative district of Ellesmere Port and Chester Rural, an area stretching from Ellesmere Port to Malpas and skirting the eastern edge of the Chester City boundary. At the age of 11, ‘higher’ ability children would travel to Ellesmere Port Boys’ and Girls’ Grammar Schools for their education and a new school planned for Christleton would cater for the remainder.

This Secondary Modern and Secondary Technical School was designed to cater for the needs of pupils in the developing areas of Vicars Cross, Guilden Sutton, Mickle Trafford, Waverton, Barrow and Christleton, but also took in many other parts of the rural district, an area of 75 sq miles.

At its official opening on Friday 3 October 1958, Christleton County Secondary Modern School, as it was then called, became the 17th Secondary Modern School and 57th completed new school to open in Cheshire.

Sports facilities 
Christleton High School has access to the council owned Christleton Sports Centre, located on the school site.  The facilities include a sports hall, gym, squash court, dance studio, a large outdoor floodlit court, an all-weather pitch and swimming pool.

Ofsted 
The School currently has an Outstanding Ofsted which was given in 2014. A previous inspection in 2006 by Ofsted gave the School Notice to Improve and a further inspection in 2007 rated the school as Satisfactory. In 2010 Ofsted rated the School as Good.

Smoking at the School 
The school first made headlines in 2002 when former headteacher Geoff Lawson introduced an experiment aimed at helping nicotine-addicted pupils quit smoking. Fifteen-year-old pupils from the school were permitted two cigarette breaks a day under strict supervision of teachers. This policy no longer applies with smoking being forbidden on school grounds.

Notable pupils 

 Sarah Atherton, MP
 Samantha Dixon, MP
 Russell Griffiths, footballer
 Luke Pollard, MP

References

External links 
Christleton High School's official website
Christleton Sports Centre's official website
News including the Headteacher’s Weekly Blog
 https://www.christletonhigh.co.uk/

The Swan
 https://www.christletonhigh.co.uk/school-information/swan-newsletter.php

Christleton High School Staff List
 https://www.christletonhigh.co.uk/school-information/staff-list.php

Academies in Cheshire West and Chester
Educational institutions established in 1958
Schools in Chester
1958 establishments in England
Secondary schools in Cheshire West and Chester
People educated at Christleton High School